Tephritis hendeliana is a species of tephritid or fruit flies in the genus Tephritis of the family Tephritidae.

Distribution
France, Germany & Central Russia South to Spain, Italy, Ukraine, Caucasus & Mongolia.

References

Tephritinae
Insects described in 1944
Diptera of Europe
Diptera of Asia